Sunepitron (developmental code name CP-93,393) is a combined 5-HT1A receptor agonist and α2-adrenergic receptor antagonist. It was previously under development by Pfizer for the treatment of depression and anxiety. It made it to phase III clinical trials before being discontinued.

Chemistry

Synthesis

The synthesis starts by conversion of the pyridine dicarboxylic acid (1) to its acid chloride; rxn with MeOH then affords the ester (2). Catalytic hydrogenation serves to reduce the pyridine ring to a piperidine of undefined stereochemistry (3). Alkylation of this intermediate with chloroacetonitrile affords (4). Treatment of that intermediate with Raney nickel reduces the cyano group to the corresponding primary amine; this product then undergoes an internal ester-amine interchange to yield the cyclized lactam (5). LAH serves to reduce the lactam to an amine; the ester on the other ring is reduced to a carbinol in the process, affording the aminoalcohol (7). The basic function is next alkylated with 2-chloropyrimidine (7). Rxn of the alcoholin (8) with MsCl leads to the mesylate; that group is next displaced by sodium azide (9); the azide group is next reduced to the primary amine. Resolution of this product as its mandelate salt then yields (10) as a single enantiomer. Rxn of that product with succinic anhydride converts the pendant amine to a succinimide, affording the anxiolytic agent sunepitron (1).

See also 
 Lesopitron

References 

5-HT1A agonists
Abandoned drugs
Alpha-2 blockers
Pyrimidines
Succinimides